Oreonectes barbatus is a species of cyprinid of the genus Oreonectes. It inhabits Guangxi, China. It was described by Gan in 2013 and has not been classified on the IUCN Red List.

References

Cyprinid fish of Asia
Freshwater fish of China
Fish described in 2013